The United States Lighthouse Tender Marigold was a lighthouse tender which served on the Great Lakes.  She was launched in 1890 and delivered to the depot in Detroit early in 1891. The tender spent an unremarkable career in service, never needing a major retrofit and being drydocked only for a few minor repairs.  She was decommissioned in 1945 and sold into private service in 1946, and spent her last years, having been extensively rebuilt, operating as a dredge under the name Miss Mudhen II.  Her last registered owner was Bay Harbor Marina in 1977.  She was used sporadically into the early 1980s and was eventually scrapped in the 1990s.  Despite persistent rumors her hull was not scuttled.

References

External links
 Seeing the Light : USLHT Marigold

Lighthouse tenders of the United States
1890 ships